EZI is the stage name of American singer, songwriter & actress Esther Zynn who currently resides in Los Angeles California. Before releasing music, EZI starred in the 2016 Nickelodeon television series The Other Kingdom Shortly after, EZI became the face of Steve Madden’s “Madden Girl” campaign and was the first artist to sign to Madden’s independent record label 5 Towns Records. Her single "Dancing in a Room" from her 2018 debut EP Afraid Of The Dark hit #32 on the Billboard US dance charts and peaked at #13. To date, the EP has accumulated over 30 million streams independently. EZI's music has also been featured in several TV shows & movies including the acclaimed Netflix original series Atypical. Perez Hilton is quoted calling her music “ear candy”. In 2019, EZI signed a publishing deal with Tim Blacksmith and Danny D's Stellar Songs, administered by Warner Chappell. She has written songs for several other notable artists such as Kaskade, Sabrina Claudio, Kiiara, SadMoney, Stela Cole and Party Favor.

Personal life
Zynn was born in New York and lives in Los Angeles, as of 2018.

Filmography

Television
 The Other Kingdom

Discography
EPs
 Afraid of the Dark (2018)

References

External links
 
 Esther Zynn at IMDb

Living people
21st-century American actresses
21st-century American women singers
Actresses from Los Angeles
Actresses from New York (state)
Singers from Los Angeles
Singer-songwriters from New York (state)
American television actresses
21st-century American singers
American women singer-songwriters
1997 births
Singer-songwriters from California